Fremont Unified School District (FUSD) is a primary and secondary education school district located in Fremont, California, United States.

The district has 39 school campuses.

School campuses and attendance areas 
The district determines attendance at schools based on where an individual lives as its priority. There are five main attendance areas: American Attendance Area, Irvington Attendance Area, Kennedy Attendance Area, Mission Attendance Area and Washington Attendance Area. All include one high school and one junior high school, in addition to either four or six elementary schools. The attendance areas are further split up into smaller zones for the elementary schools. Often, overcrowding in primary schools is addressed by moving students to another elementary school in the same attendance area.

List 
Here is the list of schools in Alphabetical order:

There are 8 schools in American attendance area, 11 in Irvington, 12 in Kennedy, 6 in Mission San Jose, and 8 in Washington.

References 

Fremont Unified School District
Education in Fremont, California
Schools in Alameda County, California